Caribbean poetry is vast and rapidly evolving field of poetry written by people from the Caribbean region and the diaspora.

Caribbean poetry generally refers to a myriad of poetic forms, spanning epic, lyrical verse, prose poems, dramatic poetry and oral poetry, composed in Caribbean territories regardless of language. It is most often, however, written in English, Spanish, Spanglish, French, Hindustani, Dutch, or any number of creoles. Poetry in English from the former British West Indies has been referred to as Anglo-Caribbean poetry or West Indian poetry.

Since the mid-1970s, Caribbean poetry has gained increasing visibility with the publication in Britain and North America of several anthologies. Over the decades the canon has shifted and expanded, drawing both on oral and literary traditions and including more women poets and politically charged works. Caribbean writers, performance poets, newspaper poets, singer-songwriters have created a popular art form, a poetry heard by audiences all over the world. Caribbean oral poetry shares the vigour of the written tradition.

Among the most prominent Caribbean poets whose works are widely studied (and translated into other languages) are: Derek Walcott (who won the 1992 Nobel Prize for Literature), Kamau Brathwaite, Edouard Glissant, Giannina Braschi, Lorna Goodinson, Aimé Fernand Césaire, Linton Kwesi Johnson, Kwame Dawes, and Claudia Rankine.

Common themes include: exile and return to the motherland; the relationship of language to nation; colonialism and postcolonialism; self-determination and liberty; racial identity.

Caribbean epic poetry 

Derek Walcott's Omeros (1990) is one of the most renown epic poems of the 20th century and of the Caribbean. The work is divided into seven books containing sixty-four chapters. Most of the poem is composed in a three-line form that is reminiscent of the terza rima form that Dante used for The Divine Comedy. The work, referencing Homer and other characters from the Iliad, refers to Greek, Roman, and American slavery. The narrative arch of the epic takes place on the island of St. Lucia, where Walcott was born and raised, but includes imaginings of ancient Greece and Rome, as well as travels to modern day Lisbon, London, Dublin, Toronto.

Giannina Braschi's Empire of Dreams (1988) is a postmodern Caribbean epic composed of six books of poetry that blend elements of eclogues, epigrams, lyrics, prose poem, and manifesto. Braschi's United States of Banana (2011) is a geopolitical tragic-comedy about the fall of the American empire, the liberation of Puerto Rico, and the unification of the Caribbean isles. Blending elements of poetry, lyrical essay, and dramatic dialogues, this postmodern epic tackles the subjects of global debt, labor abuse, and environmental crises on the rise.

Anthony Kellman created the Caribbean poetic form Tuk Verse, which incorporates melodic and rhythmic elements of Barbadian indigenous folk music called Tuk. His 2008 book Limestone: An Epic Poem of Barbados is the first published epic poem of Barbados.

Caribbean poets by country
Grouped by territory of birth or upbringing.

Anguilla

 Bankie Banx

Barbados

 Kamau Brathwaite
Frank Collymore
 George Lamming
 Anthony Kellman
 Paterika Hengreaves (Patricia Hendy)
 Claudia Rankine

Cuba

 Roberto Fernández Retamar
 Nicolás Guillén
 Lezama Lima
 José Martí
 Nancy Morejon
 Jorge Enrique González Pacheco

Dominican Republic

 Rafael Nino Féliz
 Blas Jiménez
 Pedro Mir
 Chiqui Vicioso

Guyana

 John Agard
 Martin Carter
 Mahadai Das
 Mark McWatt
 Grace Nichols

Haiti

 René Depestre
 Félix Morisseau-Leroy 
 Jacques Roumain

Jamaica

 Louise Bennett
 Jean "Binta" Breeze
 Michelle Cliff
 Kwame Dawes
 Lorna Goodison
 Ishion Hutchinson
 Linton Kwesi Johnson
 Una Marson
 Claude McKay
 Kei Miller
 Mutabaruka
 Oku Onuora
 Claudia Rankine
 Olive Senior
 Mikey Smith

Martinique

 Nicole Cage
 Aimé Césaire
 Edouard Glissant

Montserrat

 Howard Fergus
 E. A. Markham
 Yvonne Weekes

Puerto Rico

 Julia de Burgos
 Giannina Braschi
 Luis Pales Matos
 Mara Pastor

St Lucia
 Adrian Augier
 Kendel Hippolyte
 Derek Walcott

St Martin

 Charles Borromeo Hodge
 Drisana Deborah Jack
 Lasana M. Sekou

St Vincent and the Grenadines

 Shake Keane
 N.C. Marks
 Cecil “Blazer” Williams

The Bahamas

 Marion Bethel
 Christian Campbell (poet)
 Telcine Turner-Rolle
 Nicolette Bethel
 Patricia Glinton-Meicholas

Trinidad & Tobago

 Vahni Capildeo
 Anthony Joseph
 John La Rose
 Tricia David
 Lauren K. Alleyne
 M. NourbeSe Philip

Further reading
 Arnold, James. A History of Literature in the Caribbean v. I and II. Philadelphia/Amsterdam: John Benjamins Publishing Company. (2001)
 Breiner, Laurence A. An Introduction to West Indian Poetry, Cambridge University Press, 1998.
 Brown, Lloyd. West Indian Poetry. Boston: Twayne, 1978.
 Bryan, Beverley. Teaching Caribbean Poetry. London: Routledge, 2014.
 Jenkins, Lee Margaret. The Language of Caribbean Poetry. Gainesville: University Press of Florida, 2004.
 
 Perisic, Alexandra. Precarious Crossings: Immigration, Neoliberalism, and the Atlantic. The Ohio State University Press.(2019)

Selected anthologies

 James Berry, Bluefoot Traveller, London: Limestone Publications, 1976.
 Stewart Brown, Caribbean Poetry Now, 1984.
 Paula Burnett, The Penguin Book of Caribbean Verse in English, 1986.
 Stewart Brown, Mervyn Morris, Gordon Rohlehr (eds), Voiceprint: An Anthology of Oral and Related Poetry from the Caribbean, 1989.
 E. A. Markham, Hinterland: Caribbean Poetry from the West Indies and Britain, Newcastle upon Tyne: Bloodaxe, 1989.
 Stewart Brown and Ian McDonald (eds), The Heinemann Book of Caribbean Poetry, 1992.
 Anthony Kellman (ed.), Crossing Water: Contemporary Poetry from the English-Speaking Caribbean, NY: Greenfield Review Press, 1992.
 Stewart Brown, Mark McWatt (eds), The Oxford Book of Caribbean Verse, 2005.
 Lasana M. Sekou (ed.), Where I See The Sun – Contemporary Poetry in St. Martin, 2013.
 Lasana M. Sekou (ed.), Where I See The Sun – Contemporary Poetry in Anguilla. St. Martin: House of Nehesi Publishers, 2015.
 Lasana M. Sekou (ed.), Where I See the Sun – Contemporary Poetry in The Virgin Islands (Tortola, Virgin Gorda, Anegada, Jost Van Dyke). St. Martin: House of Nehesi Publishers, 2016.

See also
 Caribbean literature
 Dub poetry
 Nation language
 Postcolonial literature
 Cuban literature
 Puerto Rican poetry

References

External links
 

Caribbean culture
Poetry